Many of the museums in Latvia are located in the capital, Riga.

Riga
 Andrejs Upits' Memorial Museum 
 Arsenāls - Fine Arts Museum 
 Art Museum Riga Bourse
 
 Jānis Akuraters Museum in Āgenskalns
 Krišjānis Barons Memorial Museum 
 Lattelecom Museum of Telecommunication
 The Ethnographic Open-Air Museum of Latvia 
 Latvian Museum of Architecture 
 Latvian Museum of Decorative Arts and Design 
 Latvian Museum of National History 
 Natural History Museum of Latvia 
 Latvian Museum of Pharmacy 
 Latvian Museum of Photography 
 Latvian Railway History Museum 
 Latvian National Museum of Art
 Latvian War Museum 
 Museum of Barricades of 1991 
 Museum of Latvian Television
 Museum of the History of Riga and Navigation
 Museum of the Occupation of Latvia
 Museum “Jews in Latvia”
 Museum of the Popular Front
 Magic and Theater Museum
 Ojārs Vācietis Memorial Museum
 Pauls Stradins Museum of the History of Medicine
 Riga Aviation Museum 
 Riga Film Museum
 Riga Motor Museum
 Riga Porcelain Museum

Other places
 Andrejs Pumpurs Museum in Lielvārde
 Ernst Glück Bible Museum in Alūksne
 Liepāja Museum
 Kuldīga district museum 
 Tukums Museum 
 Turaida Museum Reserve
 Ventspils Museum

See also
Latvian Museums Association

References

External links
List of museums, Vietas guide
Latvia, European Tourist Guide

Latvia
Museums
Museums
Museums
Latvia